Jorge Daniel Florentín (born 8 December 1982) is a Paraguayan former footballer who played for Paraguayan sides Sport Colombia, 12 de Octubre, Guaraní, Sportivo Carapeguá and San Lorenzo, Bolivian sides La Paz and Real Potosí and Chilean side San Luis de Quillota.

References

1982 births
Living people
Paraguayan footballers
Paraguayan expatriate footballers
Sport Colombia footballers
Club Guaraní players
12 de Octubre Football Club players
La Paz F.C. players
Club Real Potosí players
San Luis de Quillota footballers
Primera B de Chile players
Paraguayan expatriate sportspeople in Chile
Paraguayan expatriate sportspeople in Bolivia
Expatriate footballers in Chile
Expatriate footballers in Bolivia

Association football forwards